Ekhtiarabad (also Romanized as Ekhtīārābād, Ekhteyārābād, Ekhtīyār Ābād, Ikhtiārābād, and Ikhtrārābād) is a city in the Central District of Kerman County, Kerman Province, Iran.  At the 2006 census, its population was 7,513, in 1,827 families.

References

Populated places in Kerman County

Cities in Kerman Province